Longwood Plantation was a forced-labor farm in Glenwood in Howard County, Maryland, United States.

The Longwood plantation was started by Dr. Gustavus Warfield (1784-??), son of Dr. Charles Alexander Warfield, a doctor and wealthy landowner in Howard County, where he owned an estate called Bushy Park. Gustavus graduated in 1806 from the University of Pennsylvania and returned to Howard County to practice medicine with his father. The elder Warfield died intestate in 1813, and Gustavus eventually took possession of part of his father's estate.

In the 1820s, he built a manor house, part of which stands today. The name Longwood originates with the Longwood House where Napoleon was exiled in Saint Helena. Rather than the typical practice of naming estates after land patents which would have included "Ridgley's Range" or "Ridgley's Great Park". Warfield practiced medicine and ran his forced-labor farm in the house; he would keep patients in a loft above his office if they were unfit to travel. It feature numerous outbuildings and a smokehouse.

The Warfields built a graveyard for people they enslaved; it sits to the south of the house. In 1860, Robert E. Lee visited Longwood to visit his wife's first cousin, George Washington Parke Custis Peter. He returned to visit in July 1870.

A will made out in 1865 by Warfield's wife, Mary Thomas Warfield, bequeathes various parts of the property and the people she enslaved to her daughters.

See also
List of Howard County properties in the Maryland Historical Trust
Ellerslie (Glenwood, Maryland)

References

Houses in Howard County, Maryland
Plantations in Maryland
Glenwood, Howard County, Maryland